Andrew Lee Jones (c. 1955 – July 22, 1991) was an American executed for murder. He was tried, convicted, and executed in the electric chair in Louisiana for the murder of Tumekica Jackson. He was the last inmate to die in Louisiana's infamous electric chair, "Gruesome Gertie".

Overview 

On February 17, 1984, eleven-year-old Tumekica Jackson was living with her mother and her grandparents in the Scotlandville area of Baton Rouge. At 4:00 a.m., the grandmother discovered that Tumekica was missing from her bedroom. The police discovered that someone had broken the screen of the rear den window and had opened the back door. In the muddy ground near the house, police obtained a cast of an imprint made by the left shoe from a pair of size 8⅓ tennis shoes. There were no signs of a struggle inside the house.

The investigation immediately focused on Jones because his stormy romantic relationship of several years with Tumekica's mother had been broken off by her the week before. Tumekica knew Jones well, and he had been in the home many times. On the evening of Tumekica's disappearance, Jones had called the mother's home three times and had told the grandmother that he would not be responsible for his actions if the mother continued to refuse to see him.

About 6:30 a.m., the police went to the apartment where Jones lived with his sister, Terry Jones, and his half-brother, Abraham Mingo. Jones told the police he had been home all night, and both his sister and half-brother confirmed his story.

A few hours later, Terry Jones called the police and said she may have been "mistaken" about Jones being home all night. After questioning her further, the police obtained a written consent to search the apartment about 10:00 a.m. When no one answered the officer's knock, Terry Jones used her key to open the door. Officers found Jones in the bathroom washing a pair of size 8⅓ tennis shoes. The bath tub was full of dirt and leaves. The officers seized the tennis shoes and a pair of green gloves, and they requested that Jones give them a statement at the station. After signing a waiver, Jones gave the police a tape-recorded statement in which he denied any knowledge of the offense. He was then allowed to leave with his sister.

At approximately 6:00 p.m., the victim's partially nude body was found in a drainage canal. An autopsy established that the child had been beaten, raped, and manually strangled. The police again questioned Mingo. Although he initially told conflicting stories, he eventually gave a detailed account of his activities with Andrew Jones on Friday night and Saturday morning. According to Mingo, the three of them were together on Friday evening, but they had dropped Jones off in Scotlandville. About 12:30 a.m. on Saturday morning, Jones returned to the apartment. Donald Nixon was with Jones, but he stayed only a short time. Around 1:00 a.m., Mingo and Jones went to the Snowflake Lounge, but Jones left alone about 30 minutes later, and Mingo returned to the apartment. At some point between 4:30 and 5:00 a.m., Mingo was awakened by Jones's knock on the door, let Jones in, and went back to bed. When Mingo and Jones were alone in the apartment later that morning, Jones told him that "he shoulda stayed home", that "he did something he didn't want to do", and that he "done fucked up". Jones gave Mingo a TG&Y bag and asked him to throw it away, which he did without looking inside.

At Mingo's direction, police recovered a TG&Y bag from a dumpster near a grocery store. The bag contained socks, a pair of blue jeans, and a pink sweatshirt, which were wet, muddy, and stained. Later analysis identified the stains as a mixture of blood and seminal fluid. Mingo also told the police about a pair of boxer shorts that he had found in the bathroom of the apartment. The shorts belonged to Mingo, but Jones had worn them on Friday night. With Mingo's written consent, the police recovered a pair of stained brown and white boxer shorts from the trunk of Mingo's car. Analysis confirmed the presence of blood and seminal fluid on the boxer shorts.

On the basis of this information, police obtained a warrant and arrested Jones on Sunday. After advise and waiver of his rights, Jones gave a video-taped statement in which he asserted that he and Rudolph Springer had gone to the victim's house early Saturday morning to commit a burglary. Fearful of being recognized, Jones remained in the car while Springer entered the house. When Springer returned carrying Tumekica, Jones got in the back seat and pulled his cap over his face. After a few minutes, Springer drove Jones to his apartment at his request. That was the last time that Jones saw the victim.

Trial 
At trial, Mingo, Terry Jones, and Springer testified for the state. Having been granted immunity, Mingo testified about Jones's statements and his request to dispose of the TG&Y bag. Springer denied any knowledge of the crime, and he and two corroborating witnesses established his alibi for the pertinent times. Another witness, Reginald Jackson, testified that on the night of the murder, Jones asked him for a ride to Scotlandville to look for Tumekica's mother. He identified the tennis shoes, blue jeans and pink sweatshirt as the clothes worn by Jones that night.

The state also introduced the tennis shoes seized from Jones's apartment. A forensic scientist testified that these were the same size and tread design as the one which left the impression at the house where Tumekica lived, but he could not make a positive identification because of the poor quality of the soil and the resultant poor quality of the cast. But he also said that there were no dissimilarities.

A serologist established that the blood on Tumekica's underwear and pajama bottoms, as well as that on defendant's boxer shorts and the blue jeans, came from the victim. The seminal fluid found on these articles of clothing came from an individual with type-O blood, the same type as Jones's.

Jones did not take the stand, and the defense presented no evidence. The jury unanimously found Jones guilty as charged of first degree murder.

In the sentencing hearing, the state reintroduced all evidence adduced at trial. The defense presented the testimony of Jones's mother, four of his sisters, and a cousin. The jury, finding two statutory aggravating circumstances, unanimously recommended the sentence of death.

Execution
On July 22, 1991, Andrew Lee Jones was executed in the electric chair at Louisiana State Penitentiary at Angola. He was the last person executed by electric chair in this state. A law making lethal injection the only method of execution had already been passed, but it didn't take effect until September 15.

While he did not make a final statement, at a Pardon Board hearing three days before he was executed, he said:
 "There's a possible chance I did it, a possible chance I didn't do it. If I had not been drunk, nothing like that would have happened. I'm like anybody else. . . I don't want to die or anything like that."

See also 

 Capital punishment in Louisiana
 Capital punishment in the United States
 List of people executed in Louisiana

Sources
 State v. Jones, 474 So.2d 919, (La 1985).
 https://web.archive.org/web/20120415072641/http://www.burkfoster.com/AnyLastWords.htm

1955 births
1991 deaths
American people convicted of murder
People executed for murder
American murderers of children
American rapists
20th-century executions by Louisiana
People executed by Louisiana by electric chair
20th-century executions of American people
People convicted of murder by Louisiana